Chris Madsen (born February 23, 1954) is a Canadian singer, songwriter, teacher, and writer from Vernon, British Columbia.

Career
Madsen began playing the guitar at age six. At 24, he was voted "Most Advanced Guitarist" by The Royal Conservatory of Music in Toronto and Yamaha International; in 1973 he became Yamaha's head of course development, teaching guitar workshops across Canada and heading the guitar department at the company's Vancouver school. In 1980 Madsen was presented the National Performance Award for Guitar Teachers, and in 1982 the Distinguished Teacher Award for Canada. He has written fifteen books on musical technique. Eventually he moved with his family to the countryside near Vernon, where he and his wife raised two children.

Madsen has twice been recognized with awards from the BCIMA (British Columbia Indie Music Award).

Madsen released his album Black and White in 1983.   He subsequently opened the Chris Madsen Music School in Vernon, which was in business from 1992 until 2010. The school employed 14 teachers and had over 350 students. Madsen, along with Tim Reardon, founded the Music Educators Institute (MEI) in 1995.

Spiritual interests
After the release of his album, Over the Years in 2001, Madsen's official comeback album in 2007, Seagull in Flight, won him the BCIMA(British Columbia Indie Music Award) "Instrumental Group or Artist of the Year" award. His 10 albums released in 2010, including Carfirmation, Guided Meditations, and There's a World, engage in issues of spiritual consciousness.

In 2006, Madsen began and is the current director of the Body Soul Wellness Faire, a semi-annual interactive gathering devoted to physical and spiritual wellness. This wellness faire was featured on CHBC news in March 2011 and October 2011.

In March 2010, Madsen gave a spiritual workshop on the Infinite Sea of Possibilities<ref name="Sea">Staff, Writer (4 March 2010). "(Press Release) Workshop Looks at 'Infinite Sea of Possibility'''. Vernon Morning Star.</ref> at the Okanagan Centre for Spiritual Living in Vernon. On 20 August 2010, Madsen performed a concert at the Powerhouse Theatre in Vernon for the homeless and on 13 May 2011, he performed once more at the same theatre alongside his former guitar student, Canadian Artist Jodi Pederson, in a concert to help benefit the local woman's centre.

Madsen is also the author of the 2010 book and screenplay entitled Song of the Troubadour, a metaphysical romance novel set in medieval times. The album by this name won the 2011 BCIMA "Instrumental Recording of the Year" award. Madsen's 2011 album, Shoreline of the Heart'', is under submission review for the 2012 Juno Award.

Discography
 1983 – Black and White
 2001 – Over the Years
 2007 – Seagull in Flight
 2010 – Instrumental Guitar Volume One
 2010 – Instrumental Guitar Volume Two
 2010 – Swamp Water Blues
 2010 – Carfirmations
 2010 – When Love Speaks
 2010 – There's a World
 2010 – Song of the Troubadour
 2010 – Guided Meditations
 2010 – Native Flute
 2010 – Christmas Guitar
 2011 – Shoreline of the Heart

Awards and recognition
 1983 — Most Advanced Guitarist by Yamaha/Toronto Conservatory, "Taste of Spain"
 2007 — BCIMA (British Columbia Indie Music Award) "Instrumental Group or Artist of the Year", "Seagull in Flight"
 2011 — BCIMA (British Columbia Indie Music Award) "Instrumental Recording of the Year", "Song of the Troubadour"

References

External links
 The Official Chris Madsen Website
 Chris Madsen Online
 Chris Madsen at CBC Radio
 Chris Madsen's Song of the Troubadour sketches by featured artist Destanne Morris
 Chris Madsen at Biilboard.com
 Chris Madsen at Music Educators Institute
 Chris Madsen at Body Soul Wellness Faire
 Chris Madsen at Kelowna Wellness Faire
 Chris Madsen Music School

1954 births
Canadian male singers
Canadian music educators
Canadian songwriters
Living people
Musicians from British Columbia
People from Vernon, British Columbia